Oasis is a 2020 Serbian drama film directed by Ivan Ikić. It was selected as the Serbian entry for the Best International Feature Film at the 94th Academy Awards.

Plot
At an institute for people with mental disabilities, a love triangle develops between three residents.

Cast
 Goran Bogdan as Vaspitac Vlada
 Marusa Majer as Vaspitacica Vera
 Marijana Novakov as Marija
 Tijana Markovic as Dragana
 Valentino Zenuni as Robert

See also
 List of submissions to the 94th Academy Awards for Best International Feature Film
 List of Serbian submissions for the Academy Award for Best International Feature Film

References

External links
 

2020 films
2020 drama films
Serbian drama films
2020s Serbian-language films
Films set in Serbia
Films shot in Serbia